Systematic hierarchical approach for resilient process screening (SHARPS) is a cost-screening technique to assist designers achieve a desired investment payback period during preliminary design of water-using systems.  Heuristics involving equipment substitution and intensification are used to guide process changes.  SHARPS method has been used to yield cost-effective minimum water network for water-intensive facilities.

See also
Water management hierarchy
Cost-effective minimum water network

References

Mechanical engineering
Chemical engineering
Building engineering